Dmitri Viktorovich Nabokov (4 January 1977 — 14 April 2019) was a Russian professional ice hockey forward.

Draft 
Nabokov was drafted in the first round, nineteenth overall, of the 1995 NHL Entry Draft by the Chicago Blackhawks. On May 30, 1999, he was traded to the New York Islanders for Jean-Pierre Dumont. The Islanders also sent a fifth round pick to Chicago in the deal. The trade is considered to be one of the worst in Islanders' history, as Dumont went on to a lengthy career and Nabokov fizzled out quickly with the Islanders.

Career 
Nabokov played 55 National Hockey League games for the Blackhawks and New York Islanders. After 26 games and four goals with the Islanders, he did not appear in the NHL again.

Death 
Nabokov died in April 2019 of what media reports said was "a severe illness."

Career statistics

Regular season and playoffs

International

Awards and honours

References

External links

1977 births
2019 deaths
Chicago Blackhawks draft picks
Chicago Blackhawks players
Deaths from cancer in Russia
Expatriate ice hockey players in Canada
Expatriate ice hockey players in the United States
HC Dynamo Moscow players
HC Lada Togliatti players
HC MVD players
HC Neftekhimik Nizhnekamsk players
HC Sibir Novosibirsk players
Indianapolis Ice players
Krylya Sovetov Moscow players
Lowell Lock Monsters players
Metallurg Novokuznetsk players
Molot-Prikamye Perm players
National Hockey League first-round draft picks
New York Islanders players
Regina Pats players
Russian expatriate sportspeople in Canada
Russian expatriate sportspeople in the United States
Russian ice hockey centres
SaiPa players
Soviet Wings players
Sportspeople from Novosibirsk
Traktor Chelyabinsk players